Heart Internet is a web hosting company based in Nottingham, England selling domain names, shared hosting, reseller hosting and servers. It has been a subsidiary of UK based hosting and domain registration company Host Europe Group since 2011. Heart Internet is the 2nd largest web-host in the UK for websites hosted.

History
Heart Internet was founded by Tim Brealey and Jonathan Brealey in 2004. Since its launch, Heart Internet has added a range of new products to their offering, including:

 Linux and Windows Dedicated Servers – 2008
 Windows reseller hosting – 2009
 API made available to reseller services – 2009
 Virtual private servers (VPS) – 2011
 Hybrid servers – 2012
 Cloud hosting – 2013

In 2011 the company was acquired by UK based hosting and domain registration company Host Europe plc (HEG). HEG was bought by US based hosting company GoDaddy in 2017.

References

External links
 Website

Companies based in Nottingham
Web hosting
Technology companies established in 2004